"I Will Pray (Pregherò)" is a song by Italian singer and songwriter Giorgia featuring American singer and songwriter Alicia Keys. In November 2013, the song was extracted as the second single from Giorgia's ninth studio album Senza paura (2013).  Giorgia has also recorded a solo version of the song, entitled "Pregherò", which is sung in Italian. Lyric video of the single was uploaded to Giorgia's VEVO account on December 13, 2013. In 2014, the single was certified gold by the Federation of the Italian Music Industry.

Background 
On the recording of the song, Giorgia said: “I sent her the song, performed by me in Italian, even though I didn’t really think she would get back to me. She took some time to try it out and months went by. Then, when we were almost done recording the album, she called. She had it translated and adapted to her, but she also wanted to sing some parts in Italian, which is even more surprising”.

Track listing

Charts

Certifications

References 

2013 singles
2013 songs
Giorgia (singer) songs
Alicia Keys songs
Songs written by Alicia Keys
Songs written by Viktoria Hansen
Songs written by Josef Larossi
Songs written by Andreas Romdhane
Italian-language songs
Song recordings produced by Michele Canova